The Rabanus-Maurus-Gymnasium is a classical gymnasium school in the Neustadt district of Mainz.

Subjects 
The Rabanus-Maurus-Gymnasium is a classical school. The first foreign language taught is Latin and the second is English. Later, three foreign languages (including ancient languages) are required.

History 

Between 1618 and 1782 the school was co-located with the university in the Domus Universitatis. In 1773/1774, under the aegis of Emmerich Joseph von Breidbach zu Bürresheim, the school was reformed in line with the ideals of the Age of Enlightenment and was given the name  (Prince-Electoral Mayencian Emmerichian Gymnasium). 
In the following 200 years, the school changed its name and location several times.
In 1859 Heinrich Bone was made director of the school, at the behest of the Bishop of Mainz, Wilhelm Emmanuel Freiherr von Ketteler. In the course of the Kulturkampf, he was prematurely removed from office.

In 1945, the school building was destroyed by fire. 
In the following years, classes were held in what is now the Willigis Gymnasium . 
The director was August Mayer (1945–1958).
The school moved back to the rebuilt school in the Kaiserstraße on 14 June 1953, and was renamed Rabanus-Maurus-Gymnasium, after Rabanus Maurus.

Notable alumni 
Year of graduation in parentheses
 Peter Paul Weinschenck aka Pablo Tabernero (1926) cinematographer
  (1978), chemist
  (1931), art historian
 Werner Best (1921), leading Nazi
 Axel Börsch-Supan (1973), economist
 Gerold von Braunmühl (1955), diplomat, victim of the Red Army Faction
 , (1973), economic historian
  (1976), philosopher
  (1976), journalist (ZDF)
  (1962), former member of federal parliament, president of the German Israeli Society
 Romano Guardini (1903), Catholic philosopher of religion and theologist
 Walter Hallstein (1920), German and European politician (1950s to 1970s)
 Adam Karrillon (1873), writer
 Klaus Mayer (1942), priest
  (1948), local politician and writer
  (1979), gallery owner and art historian
 Harald Martenstein (1972), journalist
 Ferdy Mayne (emigrated in the 1930s), film actor
  (1960), lawyer, former member of federal parliament and top civil servant
  (1947), Catholic priest and teacher
  (1979), organ expert
  (1981 as Dorothea Dittrich), member of Rhineland-Palatinate state parliament
  (1967), physician and professor Hochschullehrer, vice president of the Deutsche Forschungsgemeinschaft
  (1989), member of Rhineland-Palatinate state parliament
  (1978), chanson singer-songwriter
  (1995), playwright
  (1987), film director
 Carl Zuckmayer (1914), writer

References

Further reading

External links 
 Official Web site

Mainz
Schools in Rhineland-Palatinate
Buildings and structures in Mainz